The 2012 Bangladesh Premier league  is also known as Grameenphone Bangladesh Premier League due to the sponsorship from Grameenphone. It was the 5th edition of the Bangladesh Premier League. The league started on 1 February 2012 and finished on 3 July 2012. 11 teams competed with each other on a home and away basis.

2012 Bangladesh Premier League teams and locations

Clubs:
Dhaka Abahani, Dhaka
Arambagh KS, Dhaka
Brothers Union, Dhaka
Farashganj SC, Dhaka
Feni Soccer Club, Feni
Dhaka Mohammedan, Dhaka
Muktijoddha Sangsad KS, Dhaka
Rahmatganj MFS, Dhaka
Sheikh Russel KC, Dhaka
Sheikh Jamal Dhanmondi Club, Dhaka
Team BJMC, Tangail

Stadiums:
Bangabandhu National Stadium, Dhaka
Shaheed Salam Stadium, Feni
Tangail Stadium, Tangail

Final standings

Season statistics

Goalscorers

Hat-tricks 

n  Player scored n goals.

References

Bangladesh Football Premier League seasons
Bangladesh
Bangladesh
1